Tender Loving Care may refer to:

 Tender, Loving Care (novel), a 1984 novel written by Andrew Neiderman
 Tender Loving Care (video game), a 1998 interactive movie based on the novel, re-released in 2012
 Tender Loving Care (album), a 1967 album by Nancy Wilson
 Tender Loving Care (film), a 1974 film about the adventures of three nurses

See also
 TLC (disambiguation)